The Hall Hotel, at 2nd and Spruce Streets in Magdalena, New Mexico, was built in 1916.  It was listed on the National Register of Historic Places in 1982.

It is also known as the Old Magdalena Hall Hotel.

References

External links

Hotels in New Mexico
National Register of Historic Places in Socorro County, New Mexico
Hotel buildings completed in 1916
1916 establishments in New Mexico